The Legend of King Naresuan: The Series - Hongsawadee's Hostage is the first season of the MONO29 Thai historical series The Legend of King Naresuan: The Series premiered on January 9, 2017, and concluded on February 14, 2017. It consisted of 12 episodes. The series was developed by Nutchanon Bunsiri, Napapach Thitakawin, Pattaravadee Laosa, Patcharanamon Nontapa, Korapat Kirdpan, Sorapong Chatree based upon the original film in 2003 directed by Chalermchatri Yukol, which premiered exactly 14 years earlier. The series centers on the "Prince Naresuan" when he stayed in Hongsawadee city as a hostage.

Cast and characters

Main cast
 Nutchanont Bunsiri as Prince Naresuan (teenager)
 Napapach Thitakawin as Manechan (Teenager)
 Pattaravadee Laosa as Princess Wilaikalaya
 Pacharanamon Nonthapa as Princess Supankulaya (Teenager)
 Korapat Kirdpan as Prince Minchit Sra (teenager)
 Sorapong Chatree as Mahathera Khanchong

Recurring cast
 Panukorn Wongbunmak as Prince Naresuan (Young)
 Pattarakorn Prasertset as Minchit Sra (Young)
 NongBiw Khaokong as Saming
 Sitthochok Puerkpoonpol as Rachamanu (Bunting) - Teenager
 Atiwat Snitwong Na Ayutthaya as  king Maha Thamaracha
 Paramej Noi-Am as King Bayinnaung
 Kasarb Champadib as Maha Upraja Nanda Bayin
 Patthamawan Kaomoolkadi as Princess Thep Kasattri
 Lervith Sangsit as King Mahinthrathirat
 Sukol Sasijullaka as King MahaChakrapadi
 Rushanont Rearnpetch as Prince Ekathotsarot (Teenager)
 Aphiprach Tangjai as Prince Ramesuan
 Siraprapha Sukdumrong as Queen Wisutkasat
 Nussara Prawanna as Queen Meng Pyu
 Jirawath Wachirasarunpatha as Binnya Dala
 Tanayong Wongtrakul as Lord Luckwaitummoo
 Nong Chernyim as millionaire Tuam
 Krilash Kreangkrai as Pra Sunthornsongkram
 Surasak Chaiaat as Orkya Charkri

Episode

Production
Mr. Chalermchatri Yukol director said, "I'm very happy. But there is space for improvement, because it was the first time I created a TV series. We work every week. But we do not do all the same. The damage was moderate. Cost and more time but enough to continue. We control these things better. Better actor we took the problem from the movie The Legend of Suriyothai to fix in the film King Naresuan. And we took the knowledge from this film to fix in the film Panthai Norasing. And we took the knowledge from this film to come to this drama. Make the series look more modern. This is one of the experiments.

References

External links 
 The Legend of King Naresuan: The Series (season 1) all episode

2017 Thai television seasons